Charles "Yogi" Jones is a former American football linebacker who played professionally in the National Football League (NFL) for the Dallas Cowboys. He played college football at University of Pittsburgh. For the 2022 European League of Football season he is the new head coach of the Hamburg Sea Devils.

Early years
Jones arrived as a freshman at Pitt in 1977. He played his last game as a fifth-year-senior tri-captain for the No. 1-ranked University of Pittsburgh team in 1982.

Professional career
Charles "Yogi" Jones signed 1983 as an undrafted rookie with the Dallas Cowboys. He was injured after preseason games and in training camp, forcing him to end his professional career.

Coaching career
After his professional player career he was engaged in several coaching positions. On February 3, 2022, he was officially announced as the new head coach of the Hamburg Sea Devils in the European League of Football.

Personal life
He is married and has two children.

References

External links
 Bethune–Cookman coach bio

Living people
American football outside linebackers
Pittsburgh Panthers football players
Dallas Cowboys players
African-American players of American football
21st-century African-American people
20th-century African-American people
European League of Football coaches
Year of birth missing (living people)
1960s births